Martin Smolinski (born 6 December 1984, in Munich, West Germany) is a former international motorcycle speedway and Grasstrack rider from Germany. He is eight times champion of Germany.

Career
Smolinksi began riding in his natiove Germany for MSC Olching. He became the German junior champion in 2003 and after reaching the final 2003 Speedway Under-21 World Championship he signed for Coventry Bees in England.

Coventry retained him for the following two seasons and his form improved over the next two seasons. In 2006, he signed for his first Polish club Rybnik and in 2007 became the German Champion for the first time. Also in 2007, he won the league and cup double with Coventry during the 2007 Elite League speedway season.

He was a regular team member of the German speedway team at senior level and represented them in the annual Speedway World Cup. In 2010, he won his third German title and began concentrating mainly on Long track.

He would win eight German speedway Championships but his finest success came in 2018 when he won the 2018 Individual Long Track World Championship.

Speedway Grand Prix

Major results

Speedway

World team championship
 2003 - 10th place (1 point in Event 1)
 2004 - 2nd place in Qualifying round 1 (14 points)
 2005 - 8th place (2 points in Event 2)
 2006 - 2nd place in Qualifying round 1 (9 points)
 2007 - 2nd place in Qualifying round 1 (13 points)
 2008 - 2nd place in Qualifying round 1 (12 points)
 2009 - 2nd place in Qualifying round 1 (10 points)

Other

World U-21 World Championship
 2003 - 15th place (2 points)
 2004 - 6th place (9 points)
 2005 - 15th place (2 points)

Team U-21 World Championship
 2005 - 2nd in Qualifying Round 1 (8 points)

U-19 European Championship
 2000 - 4th place (11 points + 2)
 2002 - 13th place (4 points)
 2003 - 16th place (2 points)

European Pairs Championship
 2004 - 10 points in Semi-Final 1
 2006 - 16 points in Semi-Final 2

Longtrack
Grand-Prix Series

World Longtrack Best Grand-Prix Results
  Herxheim First 2018, Second 2019
  La Reole First 2019
  Marianske Lazne First 2011
  Marmande First 2011, Third 2012
  Mühldorf First 2018, 2019, Second 2016, Third 2014
  Roden First 2018
  Rzeszow First 2013
  Vechta Second 2012

World Longtrack Team Championship

 2010  Morizes (First) 49pts (rode with Matthias Kröger, Stephan Katt, Richard Speiser)
 2011  Scheeßel (First) 56pts (rode with Stephan Katt, Richard Speiser, Jorg Tebbe)
 2016  Marianske Lazne (Runners-up) 44pts (rode with Michael Hartel, Jorg Tebbe, Stephan Katt)

Grasstrack
European Grasstrack Championship

Finals
 2010  La Reole Third - 17pts
 2011  Skegness First - 18pts
 2012  Eenrum Did not start

References

1984 births
Living people
German speedway riders
Coventry Bees riders
Individual Speedway Long Track World Championship riders
Sportspeople from Munich